is a Shinto shrine in the Kaminogō neighborhood of Isobe in the city of Shima in Mie Prefecture, Japan. It is one of the two shrines claiming the title of ichinomiya of former Shima Province.

Enshrined kami
The kami enshrined at Izawa-no-miya is:
 , one of the mitama of the Sun Goddess

History
The origins of the Izawa-no-miya are unknown. According to the spurious Kamakura period , the shrine was founded by PrincessYamato, the daughter of Emperor Suinin and first saiō of the Ise Grand Shrine, who sought a place of sacrifice further east from Ise, and this was the only land in the area with rice fields. While this legend is unsupported, the earliest mention of the shrine is in the 804  and the 927 Engishiki records. The shrine was looted and burned down by forces from Kumano shrine during the Genpei War in 1180. During the Edo Period, the priests of this shrine forged a document attempting the "prove" that their shrine was the original Ise Grand Shrine and that the existing Ise Grand Shrine was an imposter. During the Meiji period era of State Shinto, the shrine was regarded as a part of Ise Grand Shrine and was not given a rank under the Modern system of ranked Shinto Shrines. 

The sacred rice planting ceremony held annually on June 24 is considered to be one of Japan's three major rice planting festivals, along with Katori Jingu and Sumiyoshi Taisha. The ceremony became a National Important Intangible Folk Cultural Property in 1990.

The shrine is located a five-minute walk from Kaminogō Station on the Kintetsu Shima Line.

Gallery

See also
List of Shinto shrines
List of Important Intangible Folk Cultural Properties
Ichinomiya

References
 Plutschow, Herbe. Matsuri: The Festivals of Japan. RoutledgeCurzon (1996) 
 Ponsonby-Fane, Richard Arthur Brabazon. (1959).  The Imperial House of Japan. Kyoto: Ponsonby Memorial Society. OCLC 194887

External links

Ise Shime Convention & Tourism official site
Ise Jingu Official site
Prefecture Official tourist information site

Notes

Shinto shrines in Mie Prefecture
Shima Province
Shima, Mie
Ichinomiya